The New England Webcomics Weekend was a webcomics convention first held March 20–22, 2009 in Easthampton, Massachusetts, United States. It was organized by webcomic artists, including Octopus Pie artist Meredith Gran. A second convention occurred November 6–7, 2010. It did not repeat in 2011.

List of official guests
 Joey Comeau and Emily Horne - A Softer World
 Chris Hastings - The Adventures of Dr. McNinja
 Jeph Jacques - Questionable Content
 Scott Kurtz - PvP
 Randy Milholland - Something Positive
 Eric Millikin - Fetus-X
 Ryan North - Dinosaur Comics
 Jon Rosenberg - Goats
 Jeffrey Rowland - Overcompensating
 R. Stevens - Diesel Sweeties
 Bill Barnes & Gene Ambaum - Unshelved

Notes

External links
 Webcomics Weekend - Official home page

Webcomics
Defunct comics conventions